"Multi_Viral" is a single by Puerto Rican alternative hip hop band Calle 13, released on November 11, 2013, as the first and eponymous single from their 2014 fifth studio album, Multi Viral. It features additional vocals from Palestinian singer Kamilya Jubran; spoken words by Australian journalist Julian Assange (founder of WikiLeaks), which were recorded at the Embassy of Ecuador in London, during his time under diplomatic asylum granted by the Ecuadorian government; and American guitarist Tom Morello, of Rage Against the Machine fame.

The song covers the topic of media manipulation and disinformation  while referencing to protests such as Occupy Wall Street and Yo Soy 132. Regarding the song, the band's singer and lyricist Residente said: "Media are controlling everything, even people's minds, everything. Here in the U.S. it's worse, it's like a bubble ... It's important to have the right information, and you are not going to get that from one newspaper or one TV show. You have to look for that. In order to get the full picture, you have to read a lot and look for yourself. Otherwise you'll find yourself in a war that you think is a good idea, but it's not for a good reason."

Morello declared he was convinced to work on the song when he knew Julian Assange would take part of it. He described Calle 13 as "comrades in arms at the barricades. One of the hallmarks of their career is weaving their convictions into their kick-ass music, and that's something I've endeavored to do in my career as well.

Music video 

The music video for "Multi_Viral" was directed by Kacho López, produced by Zapatero Filmes and shot in Bethlehem and Beit Sahour, both in Palestine. It shows a young boy using rifle parts to create a custom guitar. Amnesty International Venezuela expressed support for the video and thanked Calle 13 for their "efforts to fight violence".

Charts

References

External links
 

2013 singles
Calle 13 (band) songs
Songs about the media
2013 songs
Articles with underscores in the title
Julian Assange
Songs written by Residente